The Eight Legions (八部衆) are a group of Buddhist deities whose function is to protect the Dharma. These beings are common among the audience addressed by the Buddha in Mahāyāna sūtras, making appearances in such scriptures as the Lotus Sutra and the Golden Light Sutra.

They are also referred to as the "Eight Legions of Devas and Nāgas" (天龍八部). Asuras are also listed here as protectors of dharma in same sense as demigods are referred as "asuratvam" (holy) in Rigvedic "Hymn to all gods" where devatas are related to "asuras" (thus, protectors of dharma). Related word "Ahura-Mazda" in Zoroastrianism also mean "god".

Etymology
The name aṣṭasenā (अष्टसेना) is composed of two Sanskrit terms.

Aṣṭa (अष्ट) means eight, with connections to the Latin octo and the Persian hašt (هشت). Senā (सेना) means legion, but can be rendered army, general, warrior and the like.

Summary
The Eight Legions have their origins in ancient India as gods who belong to several domains. Many of these gods are among those spirits who are found in the lower heavens of Cāturmahārājakāyika and the Asura realm, and as such largely consist of nature spirits. 
While the list of figures within this category vary, the most common are as follows:

Variations
At Kōfuku-ji in Nara, Japan, there is a famous group of statues that represent the Eight Legions. Some of these figures differ from the common list. Their names in Japanese are as follows:
Gobujō (五部浄, Śuddhāvāsa , a deva and personification of the heaven of the fourth dhyāna. There are five gods who reside here, all anāgāmins: Īśvara, Samantakusuma, Raśmimālin, Manojava, and Svaraviśruti.)
Sagara (沙羯羅, Sāgara, the Nāga King)
Kubanda (鳩槃荼, Kumbhāṇḍa）
Kendatsuba (乾闥婆, Gandharva)
Ashura (阿修羅, Asura)
Karura (迦楼羅, Garuḍa)
Kinnara (緊那羅, Kiṁnara)
Hibakara (畢婆迦羅, Mahoraga)

There is another list of eight beings, the Hachibukikishū (Japanese; 八部鬼衆), who belong to an overlapping, but distinct category.

In Popular culture
The Chinese title of Jin Yong's novel, Demi-Gods and Semi-Devils, is a reference to the Eight Legions. His original plan was to map each major character to one race, but this proved impossible as the novel progressed.

See also

Dharmapala
Lokapala

References

Buddhist cosmology
 
Dharmapalas
Tutelary deities